Whithorn in Wigtownshire was a royal burgh that returned one commissioner to the Parliament of Scotland and to the Convention of Estates.

After the Acts of Union 1707, Whithorn, New Galloway, Stranraer and Wigtown formed the Wigtown district of burghs, returning one member between them to the House of Commons of Great Britain.

List of burgh commissioners

 1661: William Houston  
 1662–63: James McCullogh   
 1665 convention: Alexander Donaldson, provost 
 1667 convention: John McKie, town clerk 
 1669–74: Alexander McCulloch of Dromorell 
 1678 convention: David Garoch, merchant-burgess 
 1681–82, 1685–86: David Forrester, merchant-burgess 
 1689 convention, 1689–1702: Patrick Murdoch of Camlodden 
 1702–07: John Clerk of Penicuik

See also
 List of constituencies in the Parliament of Scotland at the time of the Union

References

Constituencies of the Parliament of Scotland (to 1707)
Constituencies disestablished in 1707
1707 disestablishments in Scotland
Politics of Dumfries and Galloway
History of Dumfries and Galloway
Whithorn